Bull Run Mountain Estates is a census-designated place in Prince William County, Virginia. The population as of the 2010 Census was 1,261. It is located along the east slope of the Bull Run Mountains, between Haymarket and Aldie.

References

Census-designated places in Prince William County, Virginia
Washington metropolitan area
Census-designated places in Virginia